Mateusz Cegiełka (born 9 October 2001) is a Polish professional footballer who plays for Znicz Pruszków, on loan from Chojniczanka Chojnice, as a midfielder.

Career

Cegiełka started playing with the small teams of Start Działdowo (2012-2013) and Wkra Działdowo (2013-2015) in the small town of Działdowo, Masuria. At the age of 14 Cegiełka moved to Stomil Olsztyn, the largest football team in the Masuria region of Poland.

In January 2018 Cegiełka had an early big move in his footballing career moving to Ekstraklasa team Lechia Gdańsk at the age of 16. Initially he started training with the academy teams before progressing to the Lechia Gdańsk second team (Lechia Gdańsk II) playing 26 times scoring 2 goals in the IV Liga Pomorania league.

In September 2020 Cegiełka made a permanent move to Chojniczanka Chojnice.

References

External links

Living people
2001 births
Polish footballers
Poland youth international footballers
Association football midfielders
OKS Stomil Olsztyn players
Lechia Gdańsk players
Chojniczanka Chojnice players
Znicz Pruszków players
I liga players
II liga players
III liga players